Stephen Holliday Martin (born June 15, 1956) is an American politician of the Republican Party. He was a member of the Virginia House of Delegates from 1988–1994 and the Senate of Virginia from 1994–2016.

Electoral history

In 1987, Martin defeated incumbent Democrat Leslie Saunders for the 67th District House of Delegates seat, 51%-49%. In 1989, Saunders challenged Martin for the seat, but Martin won 55%-45%. Due to redistricting, Martin was redrawn into the 27th District in 1991, and won the House of Delegates seat unopposed, and was re-elected in 1993. In February 1994, Martin won a special election to the state Senate in the 11th District after Robert Russell resigned after being convicted of embezzlement. He received 75% of the vote in a four-way race. Martin was easily re-elected to the seat in 1995 (he was unopposed), 1999 (won 65%-35%), 2003 (unopposed), 2007 (received 63% of the vote in a four-way race), and 2011 (unopposed).

Senator Martin announced his intention to seek the Republican nomination for Lieutenant Governor of Virginia in 2013 in June 2012. He was defeated at the 2013 state convention.

On June 9, 2015, in the Republican Primary for the District 11 State Senate Seat, Martin lost to Amanda Chase in a three-way race, with Barry Moore coming in last.

Election results

Memberships
Senator Martin serves as one of two Virginia state chairmen for the American Legislative Exchange Council (ALEC).

Facebook comments on abortion
Martin made news in 2014 when he wrote a lengthy post on Facebook claiming that pregnant women are "hosts" who have no right to end their pregnancies via abortion. "Martin said that his words were taken out of context and that he was trying to describe the way abortion advocates see women." He later edited the post to replace "host" with "bearer of the child."

References

 
 
 Steve Martin – Virginia State Senator Colonial Heights Chesterfield (Constituent/campaign website)

External links
 
 
 
 

1956 births
Living people
Republican Party Virginia state senators
Republican Party members of the Virginia House of Delegates
People from Chesterfield County, Virginia
21st-century American politicians